Karlovasi is a town, a municipal unit, and a former municipality on the island of Samos, North Aegean, Greece. Since the 2019 local government reform it is part of the municipality West Samos, of which it is a municipal unit and the seat. It is located on the northwest side of the island and it is considered the commercial center of the island. According to the 2011 census, the population of the municipal unit was 9,855 inhabitants. Its land area is 100.330 km2. The municipal unit shares the island of Samos with the municipal units of Vathy, Pythagoreio, and Marathokampos.

The School of Sciences of University of the Aegean is located in the town and currently there are three academic departments:
 Department of Mathematics
 Department of Information and Communication Systems Engineering
 Department of Statistics and Actuarial - Financial Mathematics
There are over 1,000 active students living in the town throughout the year.

Karlovasi is a town with a rich cultural and industrial history, being a flourishing tannery and tobacco manufacturing center in the early 1900s. Many magnificent neoclassical mansions can be seen from that period as well as the remains of the large stone-built factories at the "Ormos" seaside. 
The town's economy shifted to trade after World War II and the collapse of the leather market. Pottery and brick-making became a flourishing business due to the rare quality of the soil in the environs of Karlovasi while the town's market was continuously growing to become the largest and most important in the Island.
The connection of the Karlovasi Port with Seferihisar's Sığacık, in Turkey, brings a large number of travelers in the island.

Lykourgos Logothetis, the island's leader during the Greek War of Independence was born here in 1772. Karlovasi is also closely linked to Yiannis Ritsos, one of the country's most important poets, who spend most of his summers in his Karlovasi house, now the residence of his daughter, author Eri Ritsou.

Karlovasi has an unusually large number of almost cathedral-size churches, due to the fact that the modern town was formed by the unification of four smaller ones, all of them hometowns of wealth patrons such as tannery moguls and ship owners. The main touristic sights are the Tannery Museum, the Folklore Museum, the 11th century church of Metamorfosis, the church of Agia Triada at Paleo Karlovasi and the adjoining Venetian castle at Potami. The waterfalls of Potami and the nearby beaches of Mikro and Megalo Seitani are among the islands most popular attractions.

Communities 
The municipal unit contains ten communities (κοινότητες, koinótites).

References

External links
Official Website 
School of Sciences (University of the Aegean) 
My Samos directory - History
e-samos webpage - History & Culture 
Visit Samos

Populated places in Samos